José Luis Pintos Saldanha  (born 25 March 1964 in Artigas) is a former Uruguayan footballer. He was nicknamed "Chango" during his career.

International career
Pintos Saldanha made 19 appearances for the senior Uruguay national football team from 1987 to 1991, including an appearance at the 1990 FIFA World Cup finals. He also played in the 1989 and 1991 Copa América.

References

 

1964 births
Living people
Uruguayan footballers
Uruguayan people of Portuguese descent
Uruguay under-20 international footballers
Uruguay international footballers
1990 FIFA World Cup players
1991 Copa América players
Club Nacional de Football players
C.A. Progreso players
Uruguayan Primera División players
Copa América-winning players
Association football defenders